Five Feet High and Rising is a compilation album of songs performed by country singer Johnny Cash, released in 1974 on Columbia Records.

The album is made of songs from the 1960s up to the album Junkie and the Juicehead Minus Me. It rose to #33 on the Billboard Album chart.

The song of the same name was referenced by De La Soul with the title "Three Feet High and Rising" for their 1989 debut album.

Track listing

Charts
Album – Billboard (United States)

References

1974 compilation albums
Johnny Cash compilation albums
Columbia Records compilation albums